GMC concept vehicles produced between 2000 and 2019 include:

Terradyne

The Terradyne pickup truck was first displayed to the public at the 2000 North American International Auto Show. It featured a 6.6 L Duramax diesel V8 engine and GMC's Quadrasteer four-wheel steering, which later became a production option on full-size pickups for the 2002 model year. All four doors were designed to part in the middle, sliding torward the front and rear (similarly to minivan doors) rather than swinging outwards. It also featured an extended cab pushed forward to create more room for passengers, and a cargo bed that can be expanded from six feet to eight by means of an extending tailgate and is equipped with 110 and 220 volt power outlets, fed by an on-board engine-driven 5000 watt generator.

Terracross

The Terracross was an all-wheel-drive concept SUV unveiled in 2001. It followed a design language similar to that of the preceding Terradyne concept and shared similar sliding rear doors.

Notable features included a three-panel sliding glass roof, and a reconfigurable mid-gate and window that can create a rear cargo compartment separate from the passenger area. This idea was later used on vehicles like the GMC Envoy XUV and Chevrolet Avalanche. Similar to the rear doors of a minivan, the rear doors open by sliding toward the rear of the vehicle parallel to its sides. There are no B-pillars, and the front passenger seat can swivel to face the rear seating area. The interior of the vehicle is surrounded by translucent green lighting, and it includes sophisticated electronics such as a laptop computer integrated into the dashboard and an OnStar system.

Denali XT

The Denali XT was a concept coupe utility revealed in February 2008 at the Chicago Auto Show. Its two-mode hybrid powertrain featured a flex-fuel direct-injected  4.9 L V8 engine with cylinder deactivation. Behind the four-door cab was a 4.5-foot cargo bed, extendable to 6 feet with the midgate lowered.

Granite

The Granite was a compact crossover SUV introduced at the 2010 North American International Auto Show in Detroit. If produced, the Granite would have been GMC's smallest crossover SUV.

The front fascia strongly resembles a foreshadowing of the 2015-2020 GMC Yukon.

References

GMC concept vehicles